Conrad of Mure, also often referred to as Conrad of Muri (c. 1210 – March 30, 1281), was rector of the diocesan school attached to the Zurich Minster and author of a number of important treatises on rhetoric and poetry. His Summa de arte prosandi (1275–1276) is one of the most learned introductions to the art of letter writing in the Middle Ages.

Edition

References

1210s births
1281 deaths
People from Zürich
13th-century Latin writers
Rhetoricians